Robert Ingram may refer to:

 Robert Acklom Ingram (1763–1809), English mathematician, clergyman and political economist
 Robert R. Ingram (born 1945), United States Navy sailor and recipient of the Medal of Honor
Robert Ingram (MP), MP for Nottingham in 1318 and 1327 and for Derbyshire in 1340